Charlie Wilson (born February 1877, in Stockport) was an English footballer who played for Liverpool and Stockport County. He won the League Title with Liverpool in 1901, but was forced to retire through injury four years later. He remained at Anfield in various scouting and coaching roles up until the start of World War II.

External links
Profile at LFCHistory.net

1877 births
Footballers from Stockport
English footballers
Stockport County F.C. players
Liverpool F.C. players
Liverpool F.C. non-playing staff
Year of death missing
Association football midfielders